Radical 91 or radical slice meaning "slice" or "film" is one of the 34 Kangxi radicals (214 radicals total) composed of 4 strokes.

In the Kangxi Dictionary, there are 77 characters (out of 49,030) to be found under this radical.

 is also the 84th indexing component in the Table of Indexing Chinese Character Components predominantly adopted by Simplified Chinese dictionaries published in mainland China.

Evolution

Derived characters

Variant forms
This radical character takes different forms in Taiwan and in other regions. In Taiwan's  Standard Form of National Characters, the second (vertical) stroke and the third (horizontal) stroke share the same ending point, while in other standards, the second stroke ends at the middle of the third stroke.

Literature

External links

Unihan Database - U+7247

091
084